Deep Six, in comics, may refer to:
Deep Six (Marvel Comics), two Marvel Comics teams with the same name
Deep Six (DC Comics), a DC Comics supervillain team
Deep Six (G.I. Joe), a character from the G.I. Joe comic book series

See also
Deep Six (disambiguation)